The finals and the qualifying heats of the Women's 200 metres Individual Medley event at the 1997 FINA Short Course World Championships were held on the last day of the championships, on Sunday 20 April 1997 in Gothenburg, Sweden.

Finals

Qualifying heats

See also
1996 Women's Olympic Games 200m Individual Medley
1997 Women's European LC Championships 200m Individual Medley

References
 Results

M
1997 in women's swimming